Michelle Holland (born 1973), formerly known as Michelle Berardinetti, is a Canadian politician, who was elected to Toronto City Council in the 2010 city council election, defeating Adrian Heaps in Ward 35.

Background
Holland grew up in Chatham, Ontario. She started working as a student in the offices of Deputy Prime Minister Herb Gray in Windsor. She also worked for MPPs Sandra Pupatello and Dave Levac. She spent some time working as a consultant before entering politics herself. She then moved to Toronto to pursue her studies in International Relations at the University of Toronto.

She is married to former Liberal Member of Provincial Parliament and city councillor (Ward 37) Lorenzo Berardinetti. They were married on October 7, 2004. Known by the surname Berardinetti for much of her political career, she reverted to using her maiden surname in 2016.

Politics
In 2006, she ran for city councillor in the riding of Scarborough Southwest. She ran on a campaign of making sure that Scarborough got its "fair share" of tax dollars. She said, "A lot of our property tax dollars are being spent downtown and not here." She declared, "a road downtown will get paved two or three times before one is paved out here." City officials pointed out that this was not true, that road maintenance was based on need not location. In 2005, Scarborough accounted for 24% of the road repair budget which was commensurate with its population. She narrowly lost by 89 votes despite outspending her opponent with funds from the development industry.

On November 11, 2006, two days before the election The Globe and Mail published an article by columnist John Barber that endorsed Heaps while belittling Holland. Barber characterized her as the "wife of local MPP Lorenzo Berardinetti and so-called 'political adviser' (read: pillow talker). Scarborough deserves better than nepotism." Holland complained to the Ontario Press Council, saying the article made "serious, damaging" statements about her. The press council agreed that the article was unfair. In December The Globe and Mail published a correction stating that Holland was "unfairly demeaned" and that she in fact had more than 10 years experience working in government.

In early 2007, she sued Heaps for defamation. She claimed that he defamed her by reprinting the article claiming that he was the favourite and that Holland was not qualified for the job. Heaps and Holland eventually settled out of court with Heaps issuing an apology and paying for legal expenses.

In the 2010 election, Holland ran again for the ward against Heaps. One of the major issues was bike lanes in the ward. Holland claimed that unconnected bike lanes on Pharmacy Avenue and Birchmount Road were leading some residents who lived on those streets to move out of the ward. Holland, who described them as "bike lanes to nowhere", said that she would replace them with sharrows. This time she won the election by 2,203 votes.

Holland also has the second worst attendance record in Toronto city council, after Giorgio Mammoliti.

Holland lost to fellow incumbent Gary Crawford in Ward 20 during the 2018 Toronto municipal election.

Election results

References

External links

1973 births
Living people
People from Chatham-Kent
Toronto city councillors
University of Toronto alumni
Women municipal councillors in Canada
Women in Ontario politics